The Limburg Shotguns are an American football team based in Koersel, Beringen, Limburg. The Shotguns are currently the newest members of the Flemish American Football League (FAFL) conference in the Belgian Football League (BFL) since the 2010 regular season.

History

2010 season

 The game on week 3 was rescheduled due to a frozen underground of the gamefield.

2011 season
Pre-season
 Roots 2010 indoor American football tournament - Arena Football

2012 season

2014 season

Statistics

Performance (2010-2011)
This is an overview of the performance of the Shotguns against the teams in the BFL during the BFL regular and post seasons from 2010 until 2011.

Achievements
 Overview achievements BFL Teams

References

External links
 websiteShotguns

American football teams in Belgium
2008 establishments in Belgium
American football teams established in 2008
Sport in Limburg (Belgium)